This is a list of the members of the Iceland Althing (Parliament) from 2003 till 2007.

Election results (12 May 2003)

List of chosen MPs

Notes

2003